The 1924 Chatham Cup was the second annual nationwide knockout football competition in New Zealand.

The competition was run on a regional basis, with the numerous local associations being grouped in with the four major regional associations (Auckland, Wellington, Canterbury, and Otago) in qualifying, with each of these four regions being represented in semi-finals by one team, followed by northern and southern semi-finals and a national final. Ten teams from the Wellington region took part, and it is known that Seacliff were the only Otago entrants (North Otago, the home of Oamaru Rangers, being counted as a separate region).

The Auckland representative for the competition was not chosen via a knock-out competition. This raised concerns in some quarters that the rules of the competition were not being adhered to.

The 1924 final
The final was played in sodden conditions at Wellington. Seacliff took an early lead through W. Simmons, holding on to it until half-time. Harbour Board's Bill Palmer equalised with a header in the second half, and H.M. Margison scored two further goals, one in each half of extra time. The trophy was awarded to the winning team by Wellington Mayor Robert Wright. The losing semi-finalists contested a Charity Cup during the same weekend at the same venue, the match finishing in a 2–2 draw.

Results

First round

Replay

Second round

Third round

Auckland Harbour Board qualified as Auckland champions by winning the regional club league competition.

Quarter-finals

Semi-finals ("Island finals")

Replay

Final
Teams

Auckland Harbour Board: Jack Batty, W. Mitchell, G.S. Brittain, J. Worthington, R.I. Bell, Dan Jones, J.H. Tocker, Bill Palmer, H.M. Margison, Murray Heyes, C. Drayton

Seacliff: Charlie Rivers, George Anderson, Bill Murray, H. Cox, Alex Waugh, Bill Rogers, Malcolm Macdougall, W. Simmons, Bill Hooper, J. Baillie, Wattie Hanlin

References

Rec.Sport.Soccer Statistics Foundation New Zealand 1924 page

Chatham Cup
Chatham Cup
Chatham Cup